Burak Yavuz (born November 6, 1975 in Bursa) is a Turkish volleyball player. He is 185 cm tall and plays as a setter.

Yavuz has played for Fenerbahçe SK since 2008 and wears the number 5 jersey. He played 85 times for the national team and also played for Arçelik.

Honours and awards
 2005 Summer Universiade Champion with Turkey
 2008-09 CEV Champions League Top 16 with Fenerbahçe SK
 2008-09 Turkish Men's Volleyball League runner-up with Fenerbahçe SK
 2009-10 Balkan Cup Champion with Fenerbahçe SK
 2009-10 Turkish Men's Volleyball League Champion with Fenerbahçe SK
 2010-11 Turkish Men's Volleyball League Champion with Fenerbahçe SK

External links 
 Player profile at fenerbahce.org
 Personal web-page

References

1975 births
Living people
Sportspeople from Bursa
Turkish men's volleyball players
Fenerbahçe volleyballers
Universiade medalists in volleyball
Universiade gold medalists for Turkey
Medalists at the 2005 Summer Universiade